Pointe-Gatineau District, formerly Promenades District (District 12) is a municipal district in the city of Gatineau, Quebec. It is represented on Gatineau City Council by Mike Duggan.

The district is located in the Gatineau sector of the city. From 2001 to 2009 it included the neighbourhoods of Place Lucerne, Parc Maisonneuve, Val d'Oise and Le Barron.

For the 2009 election, it gained La Baie while losing Val d'Oise and Le Barron.

In 2011, it changed names from Promenades to Pointe-Gatineau. 

For the 2013 election, the District will be gaining the District des Riverains, while losing all territory north of Highway 148.

Councillors
Paul Morin (2001-2005)
Luc Angers (2005-2013)
Myriam Nadeau, Action Gatineau (2013–2021)
Mike Duggan (2021–present)

Election results

2001

2005

2009

2013

2017

2021

References

Districts of Gatineau